Council of the Nation elections were held in Algeria on 5 February 2022 in order to renew half of the members of the upper house of parliament.

Results

References

Algeria
Algeria
Elections in Algeria
Council of Nation election